Events in the year 1608 in Norway.

Incumbents
Monarch: Christian IV

Events
Enevold Kruse was named Governor-general of Norway.

Arts and literature

Births

5 November – Margareta Huitfeldt, noblewomen, estate owner (died 1683).

Deaths
Hallvard Gunnarssøn, educator and non-fiction writer (born c.1550).

See also

References